Bell's vireo (Vireo bellii) is a songbird that migrates between a breeding range in Western North America and a winter range in Central America. It is dull olive-gray above and whitish below. It has a faint white eye ring and faint wing bars.

This bird was named by Audubon for John Graham Bell, who accompanied him on his trip up the Missouri River in the 1840s.

The least Bell's vireo (Vireo bellii pusillus) is an endangered subspecies in Southern California. Consideration of Bell's vireo has been a factor in several land development projects, to protect least Bell's vireo habitat. The decline of the least Bell's vireo is mostly due to a loss of riparian habitat.

Description
Measurements:

 Length: 4.5-4.9 in (11.5-12.5 cm)
 Weight: 0.3-0.3 oz (7.4-9.8 g)
 Wingspan: 6.7-7.5 in (17-19 cm)

Behavior and ecology
Bell's vireos often use dense shrubbery including willows (Salix spp.), mulefat (Baccharis glutinosa), California wild rose (Rosa californica), mugwort (Artemisia douglasiana), Fremont cottonwood (Populus fremontii), and Western poison oak (Toxicodendron diversilobum) shrubs or vines as nesting locations. Bell's vireos make a well-camouflaged nest but when found they will stand its ground against intruders. As with many other North American songbirds, brown-headed cowbirds parasitise Bell's vireo nests, letting the vireos raise their young.

Historically, the least Bell's vireo was a common to locally abundant species in lowland riparian habitat, ranging from coastal southern California through the Sacramento and San Joaquin Valleys as far north as Red Bluff in Tehama County. Populations also occurred in the foothill streams of the Sierra Nevada and Coast Ranges, and in Owens Valley, Death Valley, and scattered locations in the Mojave Desert. Least Bell's vireos winter in Baja California Peninsula. Unlike during the breeding season, they are not limited in winter to willow-dominated riparian areas, but occupy a variety of habitats including mesquite scrub within arroyos, palm groves, and hedgerows bordering agricultural and residential areas. At the time of endangered species listing by the U.S. Fish and Wildlife Service in 1986, it had been extirpated from most of its historic range, and numbered just 300 pairs statewide. Populations were confined to eight counties south of Santa Barbara, with the majority of birds occurring in San Diego County. In the decade since listing, least Bell's vireo numbers have increased six-fold, and the species is expanding into its historic range. In 1998, the population size was estimated at 2,000 pairs. Nesting least Bell's vireos have recolonized the Santa Clara River in Ventura County, where 67 pairs nested in 1998, and the Mojave River in San Bernardino County. The northernmost reported sighting in recent years is of a nesting pair of least Bell's vireos near Gilroy in Santa Clara County in 1997. Roughly half of the current least Bell's vireo population occurs on drainages within Marine Corps Base Camp Pendleton in San Diego County, particularly in the lower Santa Margarita River.

References

External links

Bell's Vireo Species Account - Cornell Lab of Ornithology
Bell's Vireo - Vireo bellii - USGS Patuxent Bird Identification InfoCenter
 
 Bell's Vireo synopsis - Wisconsin Department of Natural Resources 
 Article on the Chino Hills oil spill of 1994 and its effect on the environment (including Least Bell's vireo) - U.S. Fish and Wildlife Service - Pacific Region
 Video of Least Bell's Vireo
 
 
 
 

Bell's vireo
Native birds of the Plains-Midwest (United States)
Fauna of the Sonoran Desert
Fauna of the Yuma Desert
Fauna of the Chihuahuan Desert
Fauna of the Lower Colorado River Valley
Birds of the Rio Grande valleys
Birds of Mexico

Bell's vireo
Bell's vireo